Ossun station (French: Gare d'Ossun) is a railway station in Ossun, in the department of Hautes-Pyrénées, and in the region of Occitanie, France. The station is located on the Toulouse–Bayonne railway line. The station was opened in 1866 by the Chemins de fer du Midi. The station is served by TER (local) services operated by the SNCF. This is the closest station to the Tarbes–Lourdes–Pyrénées Airport.

Location
The station is situated at  altitude. Ossun station is part of the railway region of Toulouse, and is at PK 166,450 along the line from Toulouse–Bayonne, between the stations of Tarbes and Lourdes.

The station has two platforms.

History
The Chemins de fer du Midi opened the station of Ossun, between those of Juillan and Adé, on 9 April 1866. This was just before the opening of the rest of the railway line from Tarbes to Lourdes on 20 April 1866.

Train services

The station is served by regional trains towards Bordeaux, Bayonne, Pau and Tarbes.

See also 

 List of SNCF stations in Occitanie

References

Railway stations in France opened in 1866
Railway stations in Hautes-Pyrénées